Nepotilla is a genus of sea snails, marine gastropod mollusks in the family Raphitomidae.

Description
This genus is allied to Eucyclotoma by its spirally grooved protoconch, but distinguished there from by its minute size, turreted spire, and few whorls.

Distribution
Species of this genus occur off New Zealand and Australia (New South Wales, Queensland, South Australia, Tasmania, Victoria).

Species
Species within the genus Nepotilla include:

 Nepotilla aculeata (May, 1916)
 Nepotilla amoena (Sars G.O., 1878)
 † Nepotilla bartrumi Laws, 1939 
 Nepotilla bathentoma (Verco, 1909)
 Nepotilla carinata Laseron, 1954
 Nepotilla diaphana May, 1920
 Nepotilla excavata (Gatliff, 1906)
 Nepotilla fenestrata (Verco, 1909)
 Nepotilla finlayi Powell, 1937
 Nepotilla lamellosa (Sowerby III, 1896)
 Nepotilla marmorata (Verco, 1909)
 Nepotilla microscopica (May, 1916)
 Nepotilla mimica (Sowerby III, 1896)
 Nepotilla minuta (Tenison-Woods, 1877)
 Nepotilla nezi (Okutani, 1964)
 Nepotilla nitidula Powell, 1940
 Nepotilla powelli Dell, 1956
 Nepotilla serrata Laseron, 1954
 Nepotilla triseriata (Verco, 1909)
 Nepotilla tropicalis Hedley, 1922
 Nepotilla vera Powell, 1940

References

 Powell, A.W.B. 1966. The molluscan families Speightiidae and Turridae, an evaluation of the valid taxa, both Recent and fossil, with list of characteristic species. Bulletin of the Auckland Institute and Museum. Auckland, New Zealand 5: 1–184, pls 1–23 
 Wilson, B. 1994. Australian marine shells. Prosobranch gastropods. Kallaroo, WA : Odyssey Publishing Vol. 2 370 pp.

External links
 
 Worldwide Mollusc Species Data Base: Raphitomidae
 Mollucs of Tasmania

 
Raphitomidae
Gastropod genera